The Tojiri Line is a non-electrified secondary railway line of the Korean State Railway in Namp'o Special City, North Korea, from Namp'o on the P'yŏngnam Line to Tojiri.

Services
The line was built to serve the Namp'o Smelting Complex, which processed nonferrous metals, shipping gold, zinc, coarse and refined copper, copper wire and chemical fertilisers. It received ore and concentrates from mines at Taedae-ri and Suan.

Route 

A yellow background in the "Distance" box indicates that section of the line is not electrified.

References

Railway lines in North Korea
Standard gauge railways in North Korea